Rokkin is a comic book fantasy mini series created by Andy Hartnell and Nick Bradshaw and published by Wildstorm. The series details the rise of an ordinary man named Arness, bestowed with godlike powers in his search for revenge against the tyrannical Lord Vulmax, whose minions destroyed his village and slew his wife.

Synopsis
The story begins in the village of Kenopia, home to the butcher Arness, a humble man whose primary interest is wedding his love, Dalia. In order to pay for her ring, however, he works with an older man of the village, Rothian, collecting wood. Yet this most recent night is different: Rothian has summoned Arness to help him slay a Grizzlok, a gigantic, fearsome beast never known to roam so far in the north. After a bloody conflict with the beast, Arness manages to slay it, and is paid by Rothian with both a bag of emeralds and a warning: that he should flee, for the evil hordes of Lord Vulmax are growing in strength.

After their wedding, the couple decide to heed Rothian's words and flee, so Arness ventures into the woods to forage. However, while he is gone, their home is attacked and destroyed, and when Arness returns, he finds death and destruction and his beloved wife gone. As he grieves over the devastation and his loss, he is struck down by an armored assailant and knocked unconscious.

When he wakes, he finds himself a slave to the cruel inhabitants of a foreign fortress, worked mercilessly to build its defenses against the oncoming hordes. It is this fortress that serves as the platform for Arness' adventure, propelling him into a vast world full of creatures both friendly and hostile, friends and foes, and magical relics of awesome power. But will these treasures be enough to hold back the wrath of Lord Vulmax?

External links
http://www.dccomics.com/wildstorm/

WildStorm limited series